Red Ledges is a private destination community located near Park City, Utah in the Heber Valley owned by Red Ledges Land Development Inc. It is home to the Jack Nicklaus Signature Golf Course, Cliff Drysdale Tennis Academy, and Jim McLean (golfer) Golf School. It also contains a luxury master-planned community with approximately 200 completed homes and another 100 in process.

Jack Nicklaus Signature Golf Course
Jack Nicklaus developed an ecologically-sensitive golf course that takes advantage of the topography of the land, the red rock cliffs, and the local cedar trees. The Red Ledges course has won several awards: 2010-2016 Utah Best of State - Best Golf Course, 2011-2012 Golfweek's Best Residential Course, and 2009 Golf Magazine's #1 Best New Private Course.  

There is also a 12-hole short course designed by Jack Nicklaus.

Cliff Drysdale Tennis Academy
This is the first high-altitude tennis school offered by U.S. Open doubles champion and ESPN commentator, Cliff Drysdale. The academy focuses on drilling techniques and technical instruction. Cliff Drysdale has recruited the tennis pros who have to pass his tennis teaching course before they can teach. This academy includes indoor and outdoor clay courts. 

This is the only Cliff Drysdale tennis academy on the West Coast and in Utah.

Jim McLean Golf School
Red Ledges and Jim McLean built a golf school at Red Ledges, the first in Utah and one of seven in the United States. The Red Ledges Golf School also includes winter training facilities all located at the practice facility.

Equestrian Center
There are group and individual opportunities for riding and a full training facility available to members and their guests.

External links
 Red Ledges

References

Buildings and structures in Heber City, Utah
Golf clubs and courses in Utah